The  was a war of succession in Japan during the Asuka period of the Yamato state. It broke out in 672 following the death of Emperor Tenji. The name refers to the jinshin (壬申) or ninth year of the sixty-year Jikkan Jūnishi calendrical cycle, corresponding to the Western year 672.

Tenji had originally designated his brother, Prince Ōama, as his successor, but later changed his mind in favor of his son, Prince Ōtomo. In the course of the violence that erupted as a result of factional rivalries, Ōtomo, having taken the throne as Emperor, killed himself after reigning for less than a year. His uncle Ōama then succeeded to the throne as the Emperor Tenmu.

Background
Emperor Tenji ascended to the throne and set up a capital at Ōmi-Ōtsu (currently Ōtsu city, Shiga Prefecture). He made his best efforts for the foundation of a strong country, mimicking the Tang Dynasty's bureaucracy  fron China, importing the Tangs'  political systems and consequently affecting Japanese culture as a whole. Japan was under a political unification process by the Yamato clan, seeking  to dissolve the powerful  hegemony of local prestigious clans in the Uji clan system.

The next thing Tenji needed to do was to secure his successor. His Empress-consort was Yamato-hime but there were no children between the two. He had to find the right man from the sons of non-Imperial wives. Prince Takeru was the first son but he was mute by nature and died when he was seven years old. Prince Ōtomo was the next prince of the Emperor. He was a hard worker, and was very clever and intellectual. He had enough ability to be the next Emperor.

Although Ōtomo was almost perfect, his mother was of low birth. She was from the rural area landlord's family and was not Imperial-Household-born. This was a great disadvantage in considering Ōtomo to ascend to the throne.

At the same time, a younger brother of the Emperor Tenji's was as excellent as Ōtomo. He, Prince Ōama, had almost the same fitness as the Emperor, except that he was younger. His reputation was much greater than Ōtomo because he was of higher birth and was more suitable to be the next Emperor. This was a major cause of the trouble to come.

In 670, the Emperor Tenji got sick. He realized that he couldn't live long, and he wished that, after his death, the Imperial Dynasty would pass to his son, Prince Ōtomo. Because Ōtomo's greatest rival was Ōama, the Emperor attempted to drive Ōama away. He invited the prince to his bedroom and asked if Ōama had an intention to take the throne. If Ōama answered yes, the Emperor would have arrested and punished him as a traitor. Prince Ōama was clever enough to know his trick and answered that he had no will to succeed the throne and he wanted Ōtomo to be the next Emperor. He added that he wanted to be a monk instead of inheriting the throne and would retire to a temple in Yoshino. Because there were no reasons to punish Ōama any longer, the Emperor accepted the prince's proposal. Ōama went down to Yoshino the next day and became a monk.

The Emperor declared that Ōtomo was the next Emperor. Ōtomo summoned six subjects to the Emperor's bedroom and made them swear to help him in front of the Emperor. The Emperor nodded, and several days later he died.

The War
After the Emperor's death, Prince Ōtomo began the administration activities as an Emperor. Soga no Akae (蘇我赤兄), Soga no Hatayasu (蘇我果安), Kose no Omi Hito (巨勢臣比等), Ki no Ushi (紀大人) and other subjects followed him.

On the other hand, Prince Ōama pretended to be a monk at the temple in Yoshino, but he was looking for a chance to raise a rebellion against Ōtomo and to drive him away. He secretly collected weapons and soldiers to prepare for the coup-d'etat. In the seventh month of 672, he departed Yoshino and headed for the Palace in Ōtsu where the new Emperor Ōtomo was.

Many difficulties stood in his troops' way: in some counties guerrilla attacks stopped them for many days. Every time they had such difficulties, they fought bravely and patiently against the enemies and took their supporters onto their side.

The war lasted about a month. After a desperate struggle, Ōama gained the capital. Ōtomo escaped to Mt. Nagara near the Palace, where he strangled himself to death. The subjects who supported him were arrested by Ōama's troops and punished as war criminals.

The victor, Prince Ōama, burnt the capital down and returned to Asuka, wherein he built Asuka-Kiyomihara Palace and married Empress Uno-Sarara.

Events in the War
Following dates are described in Julian Calendar.

June 672AD: Prince Ōtomo commands Governors of the provinces of Mino and Owari to let laborers be designed for the construction of a misasagi of the dead Emperor.
July 22: Prince Ōama, being informed that the Ministers of the Court of Ōmikyō are plotting mischief against them, gives orders to Murakuni no Oyori (村国男依), Wanibe no Kimite (和珥部君手) and some other servants to hasten to Ō no Honji (多品治) in the province of Mino and to let him collect weapons of all kinds for Ōama's party.
July 24: Prince Ōama, leaving Yoshino, is about to proceed to the east. He dispatches Ōkida no Kimi Yesaka (大分君 恵尺) and some of his Ministers to Prince Takasaka, who has charge in his absence, directing them to apply to him for posting bells. Accordingly, he lets Yesaka hasten to Ōmikyō and summon Prince Takechi and Prince Ōtsu to meet him in Ise.
July 26: In the morning Prince Ōama worships towards the Goddess Amaterasu Ōmikami on the bank of the River Tohogawa (迹太川), in the district of Asake (朝明). Prince Ōtsu comes to join him.
July 27: Prince Ōama proceeds to Fuwa (不破) by Prince Takechi's advice.
July 31: Prince Ōama sends Ki no Omi Abemaro (紀臣阿閉麻呂), Ō no Honji and some of his Ministers to cross over to Yamato by way of Mount Miyama (大山) in Ise. He sends Murakuni no Oyori and some servants, in command of several tens of thousands of men, with orders to set forth from Fuwa and to proceed direct to Ōmikyō. Fearing that these troops might be difficult to distinguish from the army of Ōmikyō, he places a red mark on their clothing. The Court of Ōmikyō ordered Prince Yamabe (山部王) and Soga no Hatayasu to encamp on the bank of the River Inugami (犬上川) to attack the Ōama's troops in Fuwa, but troubles occur within the Ōmi's troops and Prince Yamabe is killed and the army cannot advance. Soga no Hatayasu, who killed Prince Yamabe, returns from Inugami and stabs himself in the throat so that he dies. Hata no Kimi Yakuni (羽田公矢国), an Ōmi general, comes and surrenders. Prince Ōama appoints him general and lets him proceed northwards to Koshi. Ōmi sends picked troops to make a sudden incursion to the village around Samegai (醒ヶ井; present-day Shiga prefecture), so Izumo no Koma (出雲狛) is sent to attack them and drive them off.
August 1: Ōtomo no Fukei (大伴吹負) encamps on the top of Mt. Narayama (乃楽山). Aredao no Atae Akamaro (荒田尾直赤麻呂) addresses Fukei to let the Asuka old capital be well guarded. Fukei removes the planks of the bridges on the roads and makes of them breastworks, which he sets up on the highways in the neighborhood of the capital, and so keeps guard.
August 2: Fukei fights a battle with Soga no Hatayasu at Mt. Narayama, but he is defeated by Hatayasu and his men all run away. Upon it Hatayasu pursues him as far as Asuka, where he views the capital, but as there are breastworks set up on all the highways, he suspects an ambush, and by degrees withdraws and retreats.
August 3: Tanabe no Osumi (田辺小隅), a lieutenant-general of the Ōmi party, and his picked troops attempt to enter the encampment of Ōama secretly to attack him.
August 4: Ō no Honji intercepts Tanabe no Osumi's troops, and smites them.
August 5: Murakuni no Oyori and his men fight with the Ōmi troops at the River Yokogawa in Okinaga (息長) and defeat them, killing their General Sakaibe no Kusuri (境部薬).
August 7: Oyori and his men attack the Ōmi general, Hada no Tomotari (秦友足), at Mt. Tokoyama (鳥籠山), and slay him. Ki no Abemaro, hearing that Fukei, one of his mates, was defeated by the Ōmi men, divides their army and dispatches Okizome no Muraji Usagi (置始連菟) at the head of more than 1000 cavalry in haste to the Asuka capital.
August 11: Oyori and his men fight a battle on the banks of the River Yasukawa, and suffer a great defeat.
August 15: In Kurimoto, the Ōmi army is attacked and repulsed by Oyori.
August 20: Oyori and his men arrives at Seta. Now the Prince Ōtomo and his Ministers are encamped together west of the bridge. They fight a big battle, and finally Prince Ōtomo and his Ministers escape with their lives. Ōtomo no Fukei, being defeated at Mt. Narayama, rallies his dispersed troops again, and gives battle to Iki no Karakuni (壱伎韓国) at Chimata (衢) in Taima (当麻). A brave soldier named Kume (来目) rushes straight into the midst of Karakuni's army and defeats it.
August 21: Oyori slays the Ōmi generals Inukai no Isokimi (犬養五十君) and Hasama no Atae Shiote (谷直塩手) at the marketplace of Awazu (粟津). Upon this, Prince Ōtomo has nowhere to go, turns and conceals himself on the side of Mt. Nagara, where he strangles himself.
October 8: Prince Ōama proceeds to Asuka in triumph.

References

Sources
"Jinshin no Ran." (1985). Kodansha Encyclopedia of Japan. Tokyo: Kodansha Ltd.

Asuka period
Wars involving Japan
672
7th century in Japan
Emperor Tenmu
Wars of succession involving the states and peoples of Asia